The 2011 Nebraska Cornhuskers football team represented the University of Nebraska–Lincoln in the 2011 NCAA Division I FBS football season. The Cornhuskers were coached by Bo Pelini and played their home games at Memorial Stadium in Lincoln, Nebraska. This season was Nebraska's first in the Big Ten Conference in the Legends Division as they moved from the Big 12 Conference to the Big Ten following the conclusion of the 2010 season. They finished the season 9–4, 5–3 in Big Ten play to finish in third place in the Legends Division. They were invited to the Capital One Bowl where they were defeated by South Carolina 13–30.

Before the season
The 2011 football season marks Nebraska's entrance into the Big Ten Conference.

Recruiting

Scholarship recruits

Walk-on recruits

Schedule

Roster and coaching staff

Game summaries

Chattanooga

Source:

This game was Nebraska's first football game as a representative of the Big Ten, and the first meeting between the Cornhuskers and the FCS Chattanooga Mocs, who are members of the Southern Conference.  The Mocs finished 2010 with a 6–5 record (5–3 in conference for a three-way tie for 3rd place), including a 24–62 defeat at the hands of #3 Auburn on November 6, 2010.

Fresno State

Source:

Nebraska opened a series with another new foe never before met on the field, for a second consecutive week, when the Fresno State Bulldogs arrived in Lincoln.  Fresno State finished the 2010 season under 14th–year Head Coach Pat Hill with an 8–5 record (5–3 in the Western Athletic Conference for 4th place), including a 17–40 postseason loss to the 2010 Northern Illinois Huskies football team Huskies in the 2010 Humanitarian Bowl.

Washington

Source:

When Nebraska met Washington in their September 18, 2010 non-conference match, the Cornhuskers won 56–21 in Seattle, tying the most points ever scored by a non–conference opponent in Husky Stadium, and igniting Heisman Trophy talk around Nebraska's redshirt freshman QB Taylor Martinez.  However, a mid-season ankle injury to Martinez coincided with a downturn in Nebraska's fortunes late in the season, as the Cornhuskers finished the season by losing two of the last three games, including letting a 17–3 advantage over Oklahoma in the 2010 Big 12 Championship Game fade into a 20–23 defeat.  After the loss, Nebraska was selected for a rematch with Washington in the 2010 Holiday Bowl, where an uninspired Cornhusker squad bowed to the effort and determination of the underdog Huskies and their senior QB, Jake Locker.  The 7–19 postseason loss left Nebraska with three losses in the final four games of the season.  This closing chapter matched a mark not seen since 2007, the final season of former Cornhusker Head Coach Bill Callahan.  The 2011 meeting of these teams, this time in Lincoln, was the third time Washington and Nebraska played in just under a year.  The all-time series now has a one-game edge for Nebraska with a 5–4–1 record between the two teams.

Wyoming

Source:

Wyoming Head Coach Dave Christensen led the 2009 Cowboys to a 7–6 (4–4 Mountain West Conference) finish in his first season, including a 35–28 defeat of Fresno State in the 2009 New Mexico Bowl.  However, the Cowboys slid to a disappointing 2010 final record of 3–9 (1–7), which included a 28–20 win over Southern Utah of the FCS.  Nebraska is undefeated in all five previous meetings of these teams, with a combined scoring total of 203–69.  The series dates back to 1934, but this will be the first time the squads meet at War Memorial Stadium in Laramie.

Wisconsin

Source:

Nebraska opened Big Ten conference play for the first time, with a road game at Wisconsin.  The Cornhuskers met a team that finished 2010 in a three-way tie for the Big Ten title and an 11–2 (7–1) record, which included a 19–21 loss to #3 TCU in the 2011 Rose Bowl. Following Wisconsin's 48—17 win, the series between the two schools is tied at 3–3.

Ohio State

Source:

This game was the third all-time meeting between Nebraska and Ohio State, and the first since 1956. The game also marked the Buckeyes' first appearance in Lincoln.  In two previous three contests, Ohio State had outscored Nebraska a combined 62–27.  Nebraska trailed at halftime 20–6, and would ultimately fall behind by a score of 27–6 midway through the third quarter.  Nebraska's ultimate comeback began with a LaVonte David strip and fumble recovery of Ohio State quarterback Braxton Miller. On the next play Taylor Martinez ran past the Ohio State defense for an 18-yard touchdown, the first of four unanswered touchdowns. On the subsequent Ohio State series, Miller twisted his ankle causing him to leave the game. He did not return. He was replaced by Joe Bauserman who went 1–10 passing including a costly interception. The Nebraska offense out-gained Ohio State in the second half by a total of 250 to 45 yards. With the win, Nebraska secured its first ever victory over Ohio State and as a member of the Big Ten Conference. The win also marked the largest come from behind win in school history after trailing 27–6 midway through the third quarter.

Minnesota

Source:
    
    
    
    
    
    
    
    
    

Nebraska renewed an old rivalry against the Golden Gophers, as the Cornhuskers played at TCF Bank Stadium for the first time for Minnesota's 2011 homecoming game. The last meeting was a 1990 non-conference game. First-year Minnesota Head Coach Jerry Kill has taken over the squad following a 3–9 (2–6) finish in 2010. With Nebraska's 41–14 win in this contest Minnesota still holds a 29–21–2 edge in the all-time series.

Michigan State

Source:

Nebraska met Michigan State for the first time since the Spartans were defeated 3–17 by Nebraska in the 2003 Alamo Bowl.  Of special significance, that was the first Nebraska football victory under Head Coach Bo Pelini, as he served a one-game stint as interim Head Coach following the late-season dismissal of Frank Solich in 2003. The victory added to Nebraska's undefeated record against the Spartans, moving the streak to 6–0.

Northwestern

Source:

Following an important Legends division win against Michigan State the previous week, Nebraska dropped a stunning 28–25 decision to Pat Fitzgerald's Northwestern Wildcats.  The 2011 match up between the Huskers and Wildcats marked the first contest between the two schools since the Nebraska's 66–17 victory in the 2000 Alamo Bowl.  Despite the loss, Nebraska still holds a 3–2 lead in the all-time series.

Penn State

Source:

The game against Penn State was surrounded by the circumstances presented in the Penn State sex abuse scandal. Allegations against the former Penn State assistant coach emerged nationally in the week leading up the game. In the wake of the scandal, Penn State head coach Joe Paterno was fired the Wednesday of game week.  Penn State's contest against Nebraska marked the first Nittany Lion's game not coached by Paterno in 46 years. Before the kickoff, players from both sides met at mid–field for a prayer led by Nebraska assistant football coach Ron Brown. In the game, Nebraska led 10–0 at halftime and then extended their lead to 17–0 after taking advantage of a Matt McGloin fumble in the third quarter. Penn State rallied and had a chance to win after scoring two touchdowns and narrowing the deficit to 17–14. However, Nebraska's defense came up with two key fourth down stops to secure the victory. The game was marked with much emotion with a blue-out at Beaver Stadium in support of the alleged victims of Sandusky's crimes.

Michigan

Source:

Iowa

Source:

South Carolina–Capital One Bowl

Rankings

After the season

Awards

Big Ten all-conference first team
As selected by the media and coaches:
RB – Rex Burkhead
LB – Lavonte David
CB – Alfonzo Dennard
PK – Brett Maher
P – Brett Maher

Big Ten position awards
Tatum-Woodson Defensive Back of the Year: Alfonzo Dennard CB
Butkus-Fitzgerald Linebacker of the Year: Lavonte David LB
Bakken-Andersen Kicker of the Year: Brett Maher K/P
Eddleman-Fields Punter of the Year: Brett Maher K/P
Big Ten Sportsmanship Award: Jared Crick DT
Big Ten Freshman of the Year: Ameer Abdullah RB/KR/PR

References

External links

Nebraska
Nebraska Cornhuskers football seasons
Nebraska Cornhuskers football